Neocrepidodera springeri is a species of flea beetle from Chrysomelidae family that can be found in Albania, Bosnia and Herzegovina, and Yugoslavia.

References

Beetles described in 1923
Beetles of Europe
springeri